This is a list of notable ethnic Buryats, sorted by field and last name regardless of citizenship / nationality.

Buryat ethnicity is associated with one's father's ethnicity alone. In case mother is of another ethnicity it is not specifically expressed.

Buryats are also sorted in :Category:Buryat people. Territorially related are List of Mongolians, :Category:People from Buryatia, :Category:People from Zabaykalsky Krai.

Scientists 
 Byambyn Rinchen (1905–1977) — Mongolian linguist and historian, also fiction writer and poet 
 Gombojab Tsybikov (1873–1930) — early photographer of Tibet, ethnographer and historian
 Tsyben Zhamtsarano (1881–1942) — ethnographer and historian, Corresponding Member of the Academy of the Soviet Union, also a politician in Russia and Mongolia, pan-mongolist

Writers 
 Sengiin Erdene (1929–2000) — novelist from Mongolia

Actors 
 Valéry Inkijinoff (1895–1973) — film and theatre actor in the Soviet Union and France

 Irina Pantaeva (born 1967) — model and actress in Russia, Germany, and the U.S.
 Alexander Vampilov (1937–1972) — Russian playwright / screenwriter
 Yul Brynner (born Yuliy Borisovich Briner, Russian: Юлий Борисович Бринер; July 11, 1920 – October 10, 1985) — Russian-born film and stage actor of partial Buryat ancestry

Musicians 
 Namgar Lhasaranova — female singer, leader of traditional / ethno rock group Namgar

Political figures 
For politicians, only highest achieved positions are given in this list. 
 Dashiin Byambasüren (born 1942) — Prime Minister of Mongolia

 Agvan Dorzhiev (1854–1938) — Minister of Finance in Tibet
 Rinchingiin Elbegdorj (1888–1938) — Russian revolutionary, Mongolian Government member
 Yuriy Yekhanurov (born 1948) — Prime Minister of Ukraine
 Said Buryatsky (1982–2010) — Jihadist ideologue in Chechnya and Ingushetia
 Gunsyn Tsydenova (1909–1994) – Chairman of the Presidium of the Supreme Soviet of the Buryat-Mongol ASSR

Religious figures 

 Bidia Dandaron (1914–1974) — Buddhist teacher and writer in the Soviet Union
 Dashi-Dorzho Itigilov (1852–1927) — mummified Buddhist leader of Siberia

Sportspeople 
Yuliya Adushnayeva — female taekwondo athlete, champion of the 2008 European Taekwondo Championships
Oleg Aleksandrovich Alekseev — wrestler for the Soviet Union, champion of 1979 FILA Wrestling European Championships
 Bair Badënov (born 1976) — archer for Russia, bronze medalist of the 2008 Olympics
Boris Baglayev — champion of the 2011 World Taekwondo Championships
 Aldar Balzhinimaev (born 1993) — Russian wrestler
 Velikton Barannikov (1938–2007) — boxer for the Soviet Union, bronze medalist of the 1964 Olympics
 Bazar Bazarguruev (born 1985) — freestyle wrestler for Kyrgyzstan, bronze medalist of the 2007 World Wrestling Championships
 Aleksandr Bogomoev (born 1989) — freestyle wrestler for Russia, gold medalists in multiple wrestling events.
Boris Budayev — freestyle wrestler for Soviet Union, champion of the 1989 FILA Wrestling World Championships
 Irina Ologonova (born 1990) — female freestyle wrestler for Russia, silver medalist of the 2014 World Wrestling Championships
 Natalia Bolotova (born 1963) — female archer for Russia, silver medalist of the 1993 World Championships 
 Miroslava Dagbaeva (born 1987) — female archer for Mongolia 
 Alexander Dambaev (born 1989) — archer for Russia, silver medalist of the 2013 World Championships. 
 Tuyana Dashidorzhieva (born 1996) — female Russian archer
 Natalia Erdyniyeva (born 1988) — female archer for Russia, bronze medalist of the 2007 World Championships
 Sergey Khalmakshinov — champion of the IAAF World Championships in Athletics
 Inna Stepanova (born 1990) — female Russian archer
 Bolot Tsybzhitov (born 1994) — Russian archer
 Balzhinima Tsyrempilov (born 1975) — archer for Russia, silver medalist of the 2007 World Championships
Bair Vanjilov — combat sambo athlete for Russia, champion of the World Sambo Championships
 Bato-Munko Vankeev (born 1977) — boxer from Belarus
 Vladimir Yesheyev (born 1958) — archer for the Soviet Union, world champion of 1987
 Orora Satoshi (born 1983) — sumo wrestler

See also 
List of Mongolians
List of Oirats
 :ru:Портал:Бурятия/Список бурят (Russian-language listing with a lot of red links and list of sources)

Buryat